Eberhard II, called "der Greiner" (the Jarrer) (after 1315 – 15 March 1392, in Stuttgart), Count of Württemberg from 1344 until 1392.

Eberhard II was son of Count Ulrich III of Württemberg and Sofie of Pfirt. He married Countess Elizabeth von Henneberg-Schleusingen on 17 September 1342.

Life and achievements

They had two children: 
 Ulrich, who was killed in 1388 in the victorious battle of Döffingen and married Elisabeth of Bavaria, daughter of Louis IV. They were the parents of his successor Eberhard III. 
 Sophie (1343–1369), who  married in 1361 John I, Duke of Lorraine.

From the beginning of his regency in 1344 up to 1361 he reigned together with his brother Ulrich IV, whom he forced to sign a treaty which confirmed the inseparability of Württemberg. Soon afterwards Ulrich IV renounced his co-rule on 1 May 1362. To strengthen his might and to enlarge the territory of Württemberg Eberhard II joined several pacts and clashes with Emperor Charles IV. As a result, he and his brother received extra privileges. In 1343 he conquered the town of Mengen. 

A sensation was created 1367 by the assault of Count Wolf von Eberstein on Eberhard II and his son Ulrich during their stay "in Wildbad" (presumably Wildbad or Teinach). Both fled and seized Neueberstein Castle immediately with a large number of men. However this siege turned out to be unsuccessful.

During his regency he strongly aligned his policy against the Free Imperial Cities, which stood in the way of the extension of Württemberg's territory. He fought battles against the towns united in the Schwäbischer Städtebund (Swabian City League) in 1376, 1372 in Altheim, 1377 in Reutlingen and 1388 near Döffingen. The result of this was a stalemate which secured the independency of the towns. Nevertheless, the territorial gains during his rule were substantial, for example Böblingen and Calw.

Reception 
Eberhard entered literature through Schiller and Uhland.

References
 Das Haus Württemberg - Ein biographisches Lexikon, 1997, W. Kohlhammer

1310s births
1392 deaths
14th-century counts of Württemberg
Year of birth uncertain
Burials at Stiftskirche, Stuttgart